Namig Sevdimov (born November 23, 1981 in Baku) is a male freestyle wrestler from Azerbaijan. He participated in Men's freestyle 55 kg at 2008 Summer Olympics. He was ranked 4th-5th after losing the bronze medal fight against Radoslav Velikov.

External links
 Wrestler bio on beijing2008.com

Living people
1981 births
Sportspeople from Baku
Wrestlers at the 2008 Summer Olympics
Olympic wrestlers of Azerbaijan
Azerbaijani male sport wrestlers
21st-century Azerbaijani people